Roger Gates (died 1430) was a Canon of Windsor from 1425 to 1430.

Career

He was educated at Merton College, Oxford and became Bursar in 1405, and Junior Proctor 1408 - 1409.

He was appointed:
King's Chaplain

He was appointed to the first stall in St George's Chapel, Windsor Castle in 1425 and held the canonry until 1430.

Notes 

1430 deaths
Canons of Windsor
Alumni of Merton College, Oxford
Year of birth unknown